76 or Seventy-Six may refer to:

Common uses
 76 (number)
 One of the years 76 BC, AD 76, 1776, 1876, 1976, 2076

Places
 Seventy Six, Kentucky
 Seventy-Six, Missouri
 Seventy-Six Township, Iowa (disambiguation), several places

Arts, entertainment, and media
 Seventy-Six (novel), an 1823 American novel by John Neal
 76 (album), the debut album of Dutch trance producer and DJ Armin van Buuren
 '76 (comics), a 2007 comic book limited series by Image Comics
 '76 (film), a 2016 film starring Ramsey Nouah and Rita Dominic

Brands and enterprises
 76 (gas station), gas station chain in the United States

See also
 
 List of highways numbered